Crimp or crimping may refer to:
Crimp (climbing), a small hold with little surface area
Crimp (gambling), a bent corner of a card to facilitate cheating
Crimp (joining), a deformity in metal used to make a join
Crimp (recruitment) or shanghaiing, to shanghai or conscript men as sailors
A style of song in the British comedy series The Mighty Boosh
Crimp (wool), the number of bends per unit of length
Crimp (electrical), a type of solderless connection
Crimping pliers, tools for squeezing things together
Grain crimping, an organic way to preserve feed grain
Hair crimping, a method of styling hair
Staple remover, also known as a "crimper"
Crimp, Cornwall, a hamlet in England, United Kingdom
Douglas Crimp (1944-2019), American writer, curator, and art historian
Martin Crimp (born 1956), British playwright